Nicholas County is the name of two counties in the United States:

 Nicholas County, Kentucky 
 Nicholas County, West Virginia